"Don't Stop" is a song written by Chick Rains and Tom Shapiro, and recorded by American country music artist Wade Hayes.  It was released in July 1995 as the third single from Hayes' debut album Old Enough to Know Better.  The song reached number 10 on the Billboard Hot Country Songs chart and number 12 on the Canadian RPM country singles chart.

Critical reception
Larry Flick, of Billboard magazine reviewed the song favorably, calling it a "fun, uptempo romp."

Music video
The music video was directed by Steven Goldmann and premiered in mid-1995.

Chart performance
"Don't Stop" debuted at number fifty-four on the U.S. Billboard Hot Country Singles & Tracks for the week of July 15, 1995.

Year-end charts

References

1995 singles
Wade Hayes songs
Songs written by Tom Shapiro
Song recordings produced by Don Cook
Columbia Nashville Records singles
Music videos directed by Steven Goldmann
Songs written by Chick Rains
1995 songs